The Seleucid dynasty or the Seleucidae (from) was a Macedonian Greek royal family, founded by Seleucus I Nicator, which ruled the Seleucid Empire centered in the Near East and regions of the Asian part of the earlier Achaemenid Persian Empire during the Hellenistic period.

History

Background
Seleucus ( 358 – 281 BC) served as an officer of Alexander the Great, commanding the elite infantry corps in the Macedonian army: the "Shield-bearers" (Hypaspistai), later known as the "Silvershields" (Ἀργυράσπιδες / Argyraspides).  After the death of Alexander in 323 BC, the Partition of Triparadisus assigned Seleucus as satrap of Babylon in 321 BC. Antigonus, the satrap of much of Asia Minor, forced Seleucus to flee from Babylon, but, supported by Ptolemy, the Satrap of Egypt, Seleucus returned in 312 BC. Seleucus' later conquests included Persia and Media. He formed an alliance with the Indian King Chandragupta Maurya (reigned 324-297 BC). Seleucus defeated Antigonus in the Battle of Ipsus in 301 BC and Lysimachus (King of Thrace, Macedon and Asia Minor) in the battle of Corupedium (near Sardis) in 281 BC. Ptolemy Ceraunus assassinated Seleucus later in the same year. Seleucus' eldest son Antiochus I succeeded him as ruler of the Seleucid territories.

Seleucid rulers

Family tree

See also
List of kings of Persia
List of Syrian monarchs

References

Sources

External links

 Livius, The Seleucid Empire by Jona Lendering

312 BC
310s BC establishments
63 BC disestablishments
Lists of Asian rulers
 
Babylonian dynasties

la:Seleucidae